Claudia Comte (born 1983 in Morges, Switzerland) is a Swiss artist. Comte works in a variety of media including sculpture, engraving, installation murals and painting.

Education 
Comte earned a B.A. in visual arts from l’Ecole Cantonale d’Art de Lausanne, ECAL, Switzerland and an M.A. in science of education from Haute Ecole Pédagogique, Visual Arts, Lausanne, Switzerland.

Work 
Comte's artwork shows a wide range of influences that range from canonized artists, such as Brancusi and Jean Arp, to popular cartoons, like The Simpsons. She mixes the natural with the artificial, dissolving distinctions between what is considered intellectual and unsophisticated. In an interview with The Brooklyn Rail in 2015, Comte said she mixes classical themes with references to modern art, and then imparts her own voice on the form. 

Comte values the physical labor required to create her artwork. While in art school, Comte's classmates nicknamed her la tronçonneuse, Miss Chainsaw. The chainsaw has been Comte's tool of choice. However, Comte has asserted that her chosen tool, "has nothing to do with feminism or any other political act." Rather, it is the only tool that manipulates the material in the way she wants.

Exhibitions
Her artwork has been included in numerous solo and group exhibitions, including Zigzags and Diagnols, moCa Cleveland (2018); Swiss Performance Now, Kunsthalle Basel (2018), KölnSkulpture #9, Cologne (2017); La Ligne Claire, Basement Roma (2017); NOW I WON, Messeplatz, Art Basel (2017); 10 Rooms, 40 Walls, 1059 m2, Kunstmuseum Luzern (2017); DesertX, Palm Springs (2017); Catch The Tail By The Tiger, König Galerie, Berlin (2016); The Language of Things, Public Art Fund, New York (2016); Easy Heavy III, Haus Konstruktiv, Zurich (2014); Sharp Sharp, If I were a rabbit, where would I keep my gloves?, BolteLang, Zurich (2013); and Elevation 1049, Gstaad (2013). 

2019 I Have Grown Taller From Standing With Trees Copenhagen Contemporary, Denmark.
2019 The Cavern of Lost Dreams (nine characters). Gladstone Gallery, Brussels.
2022 Desert X AlUla. AlUla.

Collections
Her work is included in the collection of the Museum of Modern Art, New York and the Baltimore Museum of Art.

References

External links
 

1983 births
Living people
Swiss women artists
Swiss contemporary artists